Partrishow, also known as Patricio, Patrishow, or by its Welsh name, Merthyr Isiw, is a small village in the county of Powys (historically Brecknockshire), close to its border with Monmouthshire.  It is in the valley of the Grwyne Fawr, in the Black Mountains of South Wales, within the Brecon Beacons National Park.

History and amenities

The village is noted for its outstanding grade I listed 11th-century Church of St Issui with an intricately carved 16th-century rood screen, mediaeval mural paintings, and one of the oldest fonts in Wales. The churchyard also contains a grade II* listed cross. The church was originally called Methur Issui ("Saint Issui the Martyr"), a corruption of Merthyr Ishaw or Ishow. It is now known as St Patrico. It avoided Victorian restoration, and its conservation was undertaken by W. D. Caröe in 1908–09, with further work on the churchyard in 1919.

References

Villages in Powys
Black Mountains, Wales